The Malta women's national basketball team represents the Malta in international women's basketball competitions.

Competitions

Small Countries

See also
 Malta women's national under-18 basketball team
 Malta women's national under-16 basketball team
 Malta women's national 3x3 team

References

External links
Malta Basketball Association (Official website)

Women's national basketball teams
Basketball in Malta
B